Toxins is a monthly open-access scientific journal covering toxins and toxicology. Toxins is published monthly online by MDPI.

The French Society on Toxinology (SFET), International Society for Mycotoxicology (ISM), Japanese Society of Mycotoxicology (JSMYCO) and European Uremic Toxins (EUTox) Work Group are affiliated with Toxins.

The journal covers toxinology and all kinds of toxins (biotoxins) from animals, microbes and plants. Some types of toxins covered are: aflatoxins, exotoxins, endotoxins, neurotoxins, any other toxin from animal, plant or microbial origin.

Abstracting and indexing
The journal is abstracted and indexed in  Index Medicus/MEDLINE/PubMed, Science Citation Index Expanded, and  Scopus. Its 2017 impact factor is 3.273.

External links 
 
 Toxins: State of the Journal Report, 2017.

References 

Toxicology journals
Open access journals
MDPI academic journals
English-language journals
Publications established in 2009